Vilonia is a city in Faulkner County, Arkansas, United States. Its population was 3,815 at the 2010 census, up from 2,106 at the 2000 census. It is part of the Little Rock–North Little Rock–Conway Metropolitan Statistical Area.

History
Vilonia was first settled in 1861 as Vilsonia. By 1870, a cottin gin, a gristmill, general stores, and a drug store was in Vilonia. In 1873, a error caused the town name to be changed to Vilonia. In 1874, the first schoolhouse was built on what is now U.S. Highway 64. In 1879, the first post office was established. In 1887, a blacksmith shop was opened. In 1905, the Arkansas Holiness College was built in Vilonia. Sometime in the 1930's, the college closed, and was burned. On August 23, 1938, Vilonia was incorporated under mayor Thomas H. Hill.

Tornadoes

2011 tornado

A small portion of the town was destroyed by a tornado on the evening of April 25, 2011. The devastated area was a mobile home park. The tornado was confirmed and rated high-end EF2 by National Weather Service survey crews. Four people were killed in the Vilonia area as a result of the tornado.

2014 tornado

On April 27, 2014, in the late evening hours, a violent EF4 tornado slammed through Mayflower and continued on into Vilonia shortly before 7:50 p.m. (0050 UTC). Sixteen people were killed, several homes in one subdivision were swept clean off their foundations, a 15-ton fertilizer tank was thrown 3/4 of a mile, and several businesses were damaged or destroyed, including the new Vilonia Intermediate School, which had been set to open in the fall. The rating is disputed due to the fact that houses were obliterated. The NWS office in Little Rock said that if it occurred before the EF-Scale was implemented in 2007, it more than likely would have been rated F5. There was consideration for upgrading the tornado to EF5 status, but due to the low quality of construction, the EF4 rating stands.

On May 7, 2014, President Barack Obama visited the city to view the damage and reconstruction efforts. With him were Governor Mike Beebe (D), Senator Mark Pryor (D), and Representative Tim Griffin (R).

Geography
Vilonia is located in southeastern Faulkner County at  (35.077299, −92.212617).

Demographics

2020 census

As of the 2020 United States census, there were 4,288 people, 1,432 households, and 1,211 families residing in the city.

2000 census
As of the census of 2000, there were 2,106 people, 726 households, and 612 families residing in the town. The population density was 327.6 inhabitants per square mile (126.5/km). The racial makeup of the town was 98.39% White, 0.14% Black or African American, 0.52% Native American, 0.19% Asian, 0.19% from other races, and 0.57% from two or more races. 1.28% of the population were Hispanic or Latino of any race.

There were 726 households, out of which 51.9% had children under the age of 18 living with them, 69.7% were married couples living together, 10.9% had a female householder with no husband present, and 15.7% were non-families. 13.5% of all households were made up of individuals, and 4.1% had someone living alone who was 65 years of age or older. The average household size was 2.90 and the average family size was 3.16.

In the town the population was spread out, with 33.0% under the age of 18, 7.2% from 18 to 24, 35.4% from 25 to 44, 16.6% from 45 to 64, and 7.9% who were 65 years of age or older. The median age was 32 years. For every 100 females, there were 97.7 males. For every 100 females age 18 and over, there were 96.4 males.

The median income for a household in the town was $45,147, and the median income for a family was $50,184. Males had a median income of $33,684 versus $26,563 for females. The per capita income for the town was $17,495.  About 6.1% of families and 7.6% of the population were below the poverty line, including 9.0% of those under age 18 and 11.9% of those age 65 or over.

Education
Public education of early childhood, elementary and secondary school students is primarily provided by the Vilonia School District, which leads to graduation from Vilonia High School.

Nearby secondary educational institutions include the Arkansas State University: Beebe Campus, and Central Baptist College, Hendrix, and University of Central Arkansas in Conway.

Notable people
 J. B. Chapman (1884–1947), minister, president of Arkansas Holiness and Peniel Colleges, editor of the Herald of Holiness, and general superintendent in the Church of the Nazarene

References

External links
 City of Vilonia official website
 Encyclopedia of Arkansas History & Culture entry: Vilonia (Faulkner County)

Cities in Faulkner County, Arkansas
Cities in Arkansas
Cities in Little Rock–North Little Rock–Conway metropolitan area